Charles David Kersh (born December 9, 1970 in Humble, Texas) is an American former country music singer who made his debut in 1996. His first album, Goodnight Sweetheart, was released that year, producing four singles on the Billboard Hot Country Singles & Tracks charts. A second album, titled If I Never Stop Loving You, was released a year later, producing three additional chart singles. Although he never charted after 1998, Kersh remained active in the music business until 2005.

Biography
Kersh graduated in 1989 from Humble High School near Houston.

Prior to becoming a musician, David Kersh worked in various endeavors in the field of sanitation. Kersh got his musical start in his early twenties, while working at various dance halls throughout the state of Texas including being the lead singer for the house band at Dance Across Texas in Austin.

Curb Records signed Kersh in 1996, and his debut album, Goodnight Sweetheart, was released the same year, with its title track peaking at No. 6 on the Billboard Hot Country Singles & Tracks chart. The album also featured the No. 3 single "Another You" (which was written by a then-unknown Brad Paisley) and the No. 11 "Day In, Day Out".

In 1998, Kersh's second album was released. If I Never Stop Loving You was the name of both the album and its lead-off single, which was also a No. 3. The album also featured "I Breathe In, I Breathe Out", co-written by Chris Cagle; although Kersh's version of the song was never issued as a single, Cagle would later cut the song himself and take it to Number One on the country music charts in early 2002. "If I Never Stop Loving You" was followed by a No. 29-peaking cover of Eric Clapton's "Wonderful Tonight", and the No. 46 "Something to Think About".

In 1999, Kersh posed shirtless in Playgirl magazine. Later that year, he was forced to put his career on hold due to strain on his vocal cords. By 2005, Kersh had announced that he was leaving the country music scene. On his website, Kersh wrote a letter to his fans, explaining that his "heart is just not in the music business anymore".

On May 23, 2009, Kersh married singer Kerry Harvick in Comanche in Central Texas, where the couple still resides and where he works as a real estate agent.

Discography

Albums

Singles

Music videos

References

1970 births
Living people
People from Humble, Texas
American country singer-songwriters
American male singer-songwriters
Musicians from Houston
Curb Records artists
People from Comanche, Texas
Singer-songwriters from Texas
21st-century American singers
Country musicians from Texas
21st-century American male singers